The 1946 Rotherhithe by-election was held on 19 November 1946.  The byelection was held after the incumbent Labour MP, Sir Benjamin Smith became the chairman of the West Midlands Coal Board.  It was won by the Labour candidate Bob Mellish. London County Councillor Edward Martell beat the Conservative candidate, the future Gillingham MP Frederick Burden, into third place, polling more than one-quarter of the vote.

References

Rotherhithe by-election
Rotherhithe,1946
Rotherhithe,1946
Rotherhithe by-election
Rotherhithe by-election
Rotherhithe